Verkhny Karanay is a rural locality (a selo) and the administrative centre of Verkhnekaranayevsky Selsoviet, Buynaksky District, Republic of Dagestan, Russia. The population was 735 as of 2010. There are 26 streets.

Geography 
Verkhny Karanay is located 23 km west of Buynaksk (the district's administrative centre) by road. Nizhny Karanay is the nearest rural locality.

References 

Rural localities in Buynaksky District